Tafsir Furat Kufi is an exegesis of the Quran by Furat Ibn Furat Ibn Ibrahim al-Kufi (9th and 10th century A.D.) and is one of the oldest Shia Quranic commentaries. It is the most famous book of the author and is a commentary based upon traditions (Hadith). The traditions used by this book are mainly narrated either from Muhammad al-Baqir, Jafar al-Sadiq or Ali's disciples such as `Abd Allah ibn `Abbas, Mujahid and Asbagh Ibn Nubata; although there are some that relate to one of the companions of Muhammad. Tafsir Furat Kufi is similar to Tafsir Ayyashi and Tafsir Qomi in that it is selective in offering commentary on Quranic verses. Unlike the two mentioned Tafsirs however, Tafsir Furat Kufi has a Shia Islam outlook and focuses only on verses that include Shia allusions. Tafsir Furat Kufi can be titled an Imami exegesis in all aspects. It has been cited extensively by many Shia scholars of later generations.  For example, in his introduction to Bihar al-Anwar, Majlisi counts Tafsir Furat Kufi among the most important sources for his composition. Many old manuscripts of Tafsir Furat Kufi are found in Iran and Iraq.

Historical discussion
In Shia Islam it is assumed that the Imams inherited their teachings from Prophet Muhammad. The Imams therefore, are considered the first authorities of Qur'anic interpretation. Next come the disciples of the Imams who were mainly transmitters of hadith. The first formative stage of Shia tafsir is therefore referred to the period of the living Imams, including that of the four representatives of the twelfth imam during his lesser occultation. Correspondingly, the second stage is the beginning of written hadith and tafsir tradition. Tafsir Furat Kufi was written in this latter era where commentators recorded the tradition as they received it without much comment of their own. The tone of these writings is largely polemical and defensive. This can be attributed to the fact that at the time Shia theology jurisprudence and hadith tradition was struggling to find a place within the Islamic tradition.

See also
Qur'an
Qur'anic exegesis (Tafsir)
List of tafsir works

References

Shia tafsir
Zaydi literature